The 1952-53 NBA season was the Bullets' 6th season in the NBA. The team featured Hall of Fame center Don Barksdale. Their .229 winning percentage is the lowest of any team in the four major North American sports leagues to ever qualify for the playoffs. The Bullets never again made the playoffs, and the franchise folded midway through the 1954-55 season.

Draft picks

Roster

|-
! colspan="2" style="background-color: #00519a;  color: #FFFFFF; text-align: center;" | Baltimore Bullets 1952–53 roster
|- style="background-color: #FFFFFF; color: #00519a;   text-align: center;"
|-
| valign="top" |

! Pos. !! # !! Nat. !! Name !! Ht. !! Wt. !! From
|-

Regular season

Record vs. opponents

Game log

Playoffs

East Division Semifinals 
(1) New York Knicks vs. (4) Baltimore Bullets: Knicks win series 2-0
Game 1 @ New York: New York 80, Baltimore 62
Game 2 @ Baltimore: New York 90, Baltimore 81

Last Playoff Meeting: 1949 Eastern Division Semifinals (New York won 2-1)

References

Baltimore Bullets (1944–1954) seasons
Baltimore